The Evans Gambit is a chess opening characterised by the moves:

1. e4 e5
2. Nf3 Nc6
3. Bc4 Bc5
4. b4

The Evans Gambit is an aggressive line of the Giuoco Piano. White offers a pawn to divert the black bishop on c5. If Black declines, the b4-pawn stakes out  on the queenside, and White can follow up with a4 later in the game, potentially gaining a tempo by threatening to trap Black's . 

According to Reuben Fine, the Evans Gambit poses a challenge for Black since the usual defences (playing ...d6 and/or returning the gambit pawn) are more difficult to achieve than with other gambits. (Fine was once beaten by this gambit in a  against Bobby Fischer, in just 17 moves.)

The Encyclopaedia of Chess Openings has two codes for the Evans Gambit, C51 and C52.
C51: 1.e4 e5 2.Nf3 Nc6 3.Bc4 Bc5 4.b4
C52: 1.e4 e5 2.Nf3 Nc6 3.Bc4 Bc5 4.b4 Bxb4 5.c3 Ba5

History
The gambit is named after the Welsh sea captain, William Davies Evans, the first player known to have played it. The first game with the opening is considered to be Evans–McDonnell, London 1827, although in that game a slightly different move order was tried (1.e4 e5 2.Nf3 Nc6 3.Bc4 Bc5 4.0-0 d6 and only now 5.b4). In his monthly Chess Life column, Andrew Soltis commented that Evans was "the first player to be widely honored for an opening we know he played".

The first analysis of the gambit was published in the Second Series of Progressive Lessons (1832) by William Lewis. The gambit became very popular and was played several times in the series of games between McDonnell and Louis de la Bourdonnais in 1834. Players including Adolf Anderssen, Paul Morphy and Mikhail Chigorin later took it up. The Evergreen Game won by Adolf Anderssen against Jean Dufresne opened with the Evans Gambit. Eventually, however, the second world chess champion Emanuel Lasker dealt a heavy blow to the opening with a modern defensive idea: returning the pawn under favourable circumstances. The opening was out of favour for much of the 20th century, although John Nunn and Jan Timman played it in some games in the late 1970s and early 1980s, and in the 1990s, Garry Kasparov used it in a few games (notably a famous 25-move win against Viswanathan Anand in Riga, 1995), which prompted a brief revival of interest in it.

General remarks

Accepting the gambit
The most obvious and most usual way for Black to meet the gambit is to accept it with 4...Bxb4, after which White plays 5.c3 and Black usually follows up with 5...Ba5 (5...Be7 and, less often 5...Bc5 and 5...Bd6, the Stone–Ware Defence, are also played). White usually follows up with 6.d4. Emanuel Lasker's line is 4...Bxb4 5.c3 Ba5 6.d4 d6 7.0-0 Bb6 8.dxe5 dxe5 9.Qxd8+ Nxd8 10.Nxe5 Be6. This variation takes the sting out of White's attack by returning the gambit pawn and exchanging queens, and according to Fine, the resulting simplified position "is psychologically depressing for the gambit player" whose intent is usually an aggressive attack. Chigorin did a lot of analysis on the alternative 9.Qb3 Qf6 10.Bg5 Qg6 11.Bd5 Nge7 12.Bxe7 Kxe7 13.Bxc6 Qxc6 14.Nxe5 Qe6, which avoids the exchange of queens, but reached no clear verdict. Instead White often avoids this line with 7.Qb3 Qd7 8.dxe5, when Black can return the pawn with 8...Bb6 or hold onto it with 8...dxe5, though White obtains sufficient compensation in this line.

Alternatively, Black can meet 6.d4 with 6...exd4, when White can try 7.Qb3, a move often favoured by Nigel Short. 7.0-0 is traditionally met by 7...Nge7, intending to meet 8.Ng5 or 8.cxd4 with 8...d5 returning the pawn in many lines, rather than the  7...dxc3, which is well met by 8.Qb3 with a very dangerous initiative for the sacrificed pawns.

Declining the gambit
Alternatively, the gambit can be declined with 4...Bb6, when 5.a4 a6 is the normal continuation. But due to the loss of tempo involved, most commentators consider declining the Evans Gambit to be weaker than accepting it, then returning the pawn at a later stage. Black can also play the rare Countergambit Variation (4...d5), but this is thought to be dubious.

Aron Nimzowitsch states in the book My System, however, that by declining the gambit Black has not lost a tempo, since the move b4 was, in the sense of development, unproductive, as is every pawn move, if it does not bear a logical connection with the centre. For suppose after 4...Bb6 5.b5 (to make a virtue of necessity and attempt something of a demobilizing effect with the ill-moved b-pawn move), 5...Nd4 and now if 6.Nxe5, then 6...Qg5 with a strong attack.

Bishop retreats after accepting the gambit
After 4.b4 Bxb4 5.c3, the bishop must move or be captured. The common retreats are listed here, with the good and bad sides of each:

5...Ba5
Black's most popular retreat according to Chessgames.com. It gets out of the way of White's centre pawns, and pins the c3-pawn if White plays 6.d4, but it has the drawback of removing the a5-square from the black . Black usually subsequently retreats the bishop to b6 to facilitate ...Na5, which is particularly strong when White opts for the Bc4, Qb3 approach.

5...Bc5
The second most popular retreat according to Chessgames.com, with White scoring better than after 5...Ba5. This is often played by those unfamiliar with the Evans Gambit, and is arguably inferior to 5...Ba5, because 6.d4 attacks the bishop and limits Black's options as compared with 5...Ba5 6.d4.

5...Be7
Lasker's Defence has often been considered one of the "safer" retreats and has been played by Viswanathan Anand. After 6.d4 Na5 White can attempt to maintain an initiative with 7.Be2 as played by Kasparov, or immediately recapture the pawn with 7.Nxe5.

5...Bd6
The Stone–Ware Defence, named after Henry Nathan Stone and Preston Ware, reinforces the e5-pawn and has been played by several grandmasters such as Andrei Volokitin, Alexander Grischuk and Loek van Wely.

5...Bf8
The Mayet Defence, named after Carl Mayet, is played very rarely.

In popular culture
The Evans Gambit is referenced in episode 15 of Season 3 of The West Wing "Hartsfield's Landing". It is the favourite opening of agadmator, a popular chess Youtuber.

See also
 List of chess openings
 List of chess openings named after people

References

Bibliography
 
 ChessCafe.com article about the Evans Gambit (PDF)
 Handbuch des Schachspiels

External links

 Evans Gambit video and analysis
 Overview of Evans Gambit
 Kibitzer article, part one (PDF file)
 Fischer vs. Fine, New York 1963
 History of the Evans Gambit

Chess openings
1827 in chess
1869 in chess